LCDR may refer to:
 The London, Chatham and Dover Railway
 The rank of lieutenant commander